CUE domain containing 1 is a protein that in humans is encoded by the CUEDC1 gene.

References

External links 
 PDBe-KB provides an overview of all the structure information available in the PDB for Human CUE domain-containing protein 1

Further reading